Leandro Federico Reymúndez Martínez (born 1 February 1992) is an Uruguayan footballer who plays as a forward who plays for Tacuarembó.

Career
A product of Cerro and Defensor Sporting, Reymúndez has developed his career in his homeland and Chile.

After playing for Iberia in Chile and Cerro in 2021, he announced his retirement from football on 1 February 2022.

In January 2023, he signed with Tacuarembó.

References

External links
 Profile at BDFA 
 
 

1992 births
Living people
People from Florida Department
Uruguayan footballers
Uruguayan expatriate footballers
C.A. Cerro players
Montevideo Wanderers F.C. players
Sud América players
Centro Atlético Fénix players
Coquimbo Unido footballers
Cobreloa footballers
Deportivo Maldonado players
Villa Teresa players
Central Español players
Juventud de Las Piedras players
Deportes Iberia footballers
Tacuarembó F.C. players
Uruguayan Primera División players
Uruguayan Segunda División players
Primera B de Chile players
Segunda División Profesional de Chile players
Expatriate footballers in Chile
Uruguayan expatriate sportspeople in Chile
Association football forwards